Kattradhu Kalavu is a 2010 Indian Tamil-language action film written and directed by Balaji Devi Prasad, an erstwhile advertisement filmmaker. It stars Kreshna of Alibhabha fame and Vijayalakshmi in the lead roles, while choreographer Kalyan, Cochin Hanifa, Sampath Raj, Santhana Bharathi, and Ganja Karuppu play supporting roles. The music was composed by Paul Jacob with editing by Mu. Kasivishwanathan and cinematography by Nirav Shah. The film released on 28 May 2010.

Plot

Singam gets cheated out of an original idea of his by a prominent person in the society. He decides to stop pleading and start threatening. He begins with a plan to corner the big shot. He meets Krishnaveni, who has left home and needs money fast. With a common purpose, they soon become partners and  work out a plan. They blackmail the big shot with videotapes that they threaten to release all over the media if he refused to pay up. Buoyed by the success of their maiden outing, they decide to become con artists. They are successful in various ventures and finally end up blackmailing a minister. The minister, after initially caving in to their threats, decides to settle scores. What happens next forms the rest of the story.

Cast

 Kreshna as Singam
 Vijayalakshmi as Krishnaveni
 Kalyan as Stanley Deva Sahayam
 Cochin Hanifa as Vaikavardhan
 Santhana Bharathi as Vaikavardhan
 Sampath Raj as Ramanathan
 Sai Dheena as Pottu
 Ganja Karuppu
 Chinni Jayanth
 Manobala
 Balu Anand
 Nellai Siva
 Mumaith Khan in an item number

Soundtrack
The music was composed by Paul Jacob and released by Sony Music India.

References

External links
 

2010 films
2010s Tamil-language films